Obaidul Huq Khandaker is a Bangladesh Nationalist Party politician. He was elected a member of parliament from Chittagong-1 in 1979 and February 1996.

Career 
Obaidul Huq Khandaker was elected to parliament from Chittagong-1 as a Bangladesh Nationalist Party candidate in 1979 Bangladeshi general election and 15 February 1996 Bangladeshi general election. He died.

References 

Bangladesh Nationalist Party politicians
2nd Jatiya Sangsad members
6th Jatiya Sangsad members
Year of birth missing
Year of death missing
People from Chittagong District